The following is a list of the MTV Europe Music Award winners and nominees for Best Dutch Act.

Winners and nominees
Winners are listed first and highlighted in bold.

1990s

2000s

2010s

2020s

Local Hero Award — Netherlands

See also 
 MTV Europe Music Award for Best Dutch & Belgian Act

References

MTV Europe Music Awards
Dutch music awards
Awards established in 2000